Mu Ko Kam is a group of Islands in Ranong Province, Thailand.

Details
They are mostly touristic islands and are pristine and quiet, relaxed, as opposed to Ko Samui or Ko Phangan. The capital of this group is the Ranger Station of Ko Kom Tok.
There are about 10 islands with a size of 7.31 km2 and population of 0 all in Suk Samran District.

Islands of Thailand
Geography of Ranong province